The 1840 United States Senate election in Pennsylvania was held on January 14, 1840, after the regularly scheduled election in December 1838 was postponed due to the Buckshot War. Daniel Sturgeon was elected by the Pennsylvania General Assembly to the United States Senate.

Background
Democrat Samuel McKean was elected by the Pennsylvania General Assembly, consisting of the House of Representatives and the Senate, in the 1832-1833 Senate election. Sen. McKean's term was to expire on March 4, 1839, and an election would have occurred during the winter of 1838-1839 to elect a Senator for the successive term. The election did not occur, however, due to significant political unrest in Harrisburg, the state capital, over disputed election returns during the Buckshot War. McKean's seat was vacated when his term expired in March 1839 and remained vacant until the General Assembly elected a new Senator in 1840.

Results
The Pennsylvania General Assembly convened on January 14, 1840, to elect a Senator to serve out the remainder of the term that began on March 4, 1839. The results of the vote of both houses combined are as follows:

|-
|-bgcolor="#EEEEEE"
| colspan="3" align="right" | Totals
| align="right" | 133
| align="right" | 100.00%
|}

See also 

 United States Senate elections, 1838 and 1839
 United States Senate elections, 1840 and 1841

References

External links
Pennsylvania Election Statistics: 1682-2006 from the Wilkes University Election Statistics Project

1840
Pennsylvania
United States Senate
Pennsylvania 1840
United States Senate 1840
Pennsylvania 1840